Agios Ilias is a settlement in the municipality of Zacharo in southern Elis, Peloponnese, Greece. It was an independent community from 1912 until 1997.

The postal code of Agios Ilias is 27054; its phone access number is +3026250. It is situated 2 km from the coast, and 9 km southeast of Zacharo.

See also
List of settlements in Elis

References

External links
 Page of Agios Ilias settlement (Zacharo)

Populated places in Elis